The Daily Times is a newspaper based in Maryville, Tennessee, United States, which was founded in 1883. It serves the communities of Blount County, which lies in the foothills of the Great Smoky Mountains.

The newspaper is privately owned.

References

Maryville, Tennessee
Newspapers published in Tennessee
Publications established in 1883
1883 establishments in Tennessee